Noeazy (노이지) is a Korean metalcore band from Daejeon, South Korea. Formed in 2006, the band aims to spread awareness of heavy metal and rock music in South Korea.

History 
The band was founded as a student club by the members when they were undergraduate students at KAIST in 2006 and band activities continued even as they started their graduate studies. The name Noeazy is a combination of the word "noisy" and "not easy", stylized with a 'z' instead of an 's'.

Noeazy started off playing cover songs of popular bands before producing their own music, playing in campus festivals and a variety of indie music festivals in South Korea. In 2008, two of their songs were included in the Daejeon Indie Pride Compilations album, an album designed to showcase local talent from the Daejeon area. Noeazy released their first EP, The Mirror, later that year in December.

Their first album, Discrepancy, was released in 2010. Noeazy played in the Ssamzi Sound Festival where they received the Sumun Gosu award, which is awarded to talented up-and-coming bands. The band released a compilation album in collaboration with the Japanese band Gates of Hopeless in 2012 and followed it up with their second solo album in 2013, Land of Abomination. Music videos for the songs Genesis and Decay were created for the album's release. In 2015, Noeazy was invited to play in the 2015 Beyond the Ocean Tour in Seoul and Busan with other Korean rock and metal bands such as Messgram and End These Days. Noeazy's second EP, Bioshock, was released in December 2015.

In 2016, the band won the Korean Emergenza finals and was invited to participate in the Taubertal-Festival (de) in Rothenburg ob der Tauber, Germany as the Korean representatives. This marked their first show in Europe. They later celebrated their 10th anniversary by holding a concert in Club Sharp in Seoul.

Noeazy released their third album, Triangle, on 26 June 2018.

Members

Current 
 Gursong Yoo – Vocals (2006–present)
 Hyungki Kim – Guitar (2006–present)
 Yuna Kang – Drums and Band Leader (2006–present)
 Hayoung Cho – Bass (2007–present)

Previous 
 Sea Kim – Guitar (2006–2007)
 Seongsan Park – Bass (2006–2007)
 Jungjoon Park – Guitar (2006–2021)

Discography

Albums 
 Discrepancy (2010)
 Noeazy vs Gates of Hopeless (2012)
 Collaboration with Gates of Hopeless
 Land of Abomination (2013)
 Triangle (2018)

EPs 
 The Mirror (2008)
 Bioshock (2015)

Awards and nominations
 2007: KAIST Music Festival Grand Prize
 2010: EBS SPACE (ko) July's Hello Rookie
 2010: Ssamzi Sound Festival Sumun Gosu
 2016: Emergenza Korea Winners
 2016: Emergenza Best Drummer

External links 
 Official Facebook
 Bandcamp
 YouTube

References 

South Korean rock music groups
Musical groups established in 2006